Issouf Macalou (born 27 December 1998) is an Ivorian professional footballer who plays as a forward for French  club Red Star on loan from Valenciennes.

Club career 
Macalou began his senior career with the youth academy of Sochaux, before playing for Louhans-Cuiseaux and GOAL FC. On 25 January 2021, Macalou signed a three-year contract with Valenciennes. He made his professional debut with Valenciennes in a 1–0 Ligue 2 win over USL Dunkerque on 30 January 2021.

On 23 July 2021, he moved to Le Mans on loan.

On 7 July 2022, Macalou signed with Red Star. Valenciennes announced that the transfer is a season-long loan with an option to buy.

References

External links

1998 births
Living people
Footballers from Abidjan
Ivorian footballers
Association football forwards
Louhans-Cuiseaux FC players
Valenciennes FC players
Le Mans FC players
Red Star F.C. players
Ligue 2 players
Championnat National players
Championnat National 2 players
Championnat National 3 players
Ivorian expatriate footballers
Ivorian expatriate sportspeople in France
Expatriate footballers in France